Clepsis consimilana, the privet tortrix, is a moth of the family Tortricidae.

Synonyms

Tortrix consimilana Hubner, [1814-1817]
Cacoecia acclivana Zerny, 1933
Tortrix unifasciana f. cinnamomena Dufrane, 1957
Tortrix eatoniana Ragonot, 1881
Tortrix fallaciana Fuchs, 1903
Tortrix unifascina f. fuscana Dufrane, 1957
Tortrix unifasciana f. obliterana Dufrane, 1957
Tortix obliterana Herrich-Schaffer, 1847
Tortrix (Lozotaenia) obliterana Herrich-Schaffer, 1851
Pandemis peregrinana Stephens, 1852
Siclobola placida Diakonoff, 1948
Tortrix productana Zeller, 1847
Cacoecia unifasciana var. semiana Chretien, 1915
Tortrix unifasciana Duponchel, in Godart, 1842

Distribution
This species is present from Europe to Asia Minor and Syria, it is also found in North Africa and the eastern United States.

Description
Clepsis consimilana has a wingspan of 13–19 mm. The forewings are reddish-brown, with dark brown markings and two small dark spots on the hind edge. The females are more indistinctly marked on the forewings than the males. Hindwings are brownish grey. Larvae are violet green or violet grey, with pale brown head.

Biology
Adults are on wing from June to September. They are active in afternoon and evening, and comes to light. The larvae feed on various trees, including Ligustrum species. They apparently prefer dead leaves. Other recorded food plants include Syringa, Hedera, Lonicera, Polygonum, Malus, Carpinus, Crataegus and Cotoneaster species. Pupation occurs in the larval feeding place. In September usually a partial second generation takes place and in the third instar these moths hibernate.

Gallery

References

External links
 Lepiforum.de
 European Lepidopteres
 Norfolk Moths

Clepsis
Moths described in 1817
Moths of Africa
Moths of Asia
Moths of Europe
Moths of North America